The 2019 Swindon Borough Council election took place on 2 May 2019, to elect members of Swindon Borough Council in England. This was on the same day as other local elections.

Results summary

Ward results

Blunsdon & Highworth

Central

Chiseldon & Lawn

Covingham & Dorcan

Eastcott

Gorse Hill & Pinehurst

Haydon Wick

Liden, Eldene & Park South

Lydiard & Freshbrook

Mannington & Western

Old Town

Penhill & Upper Stratton

Priory Vale

Rodbourne Cheney

Shaw

St. Andrew's

St. Margaret & South Marston

Walcot & Park North

Wroughton & Wichelstowe

References

2019 English local elections
2019
2010s in Wiltshire